LEF may refer to:

LEF
 LEF, the Laymen's evangelical fellowship, a Christian organization
 LEF, the Leading Edge Forum, a research and advisory service
 LEF, the Lymphoid enhancer-binding factor 1
 L.E.F., a 2006 album by Ferry Corsten
 LEF (journal), a journal of aesthetics published in the Soviet Union in the 1920s
 The Legal Education Foundation
 Library Exchange Format in Electronic design automation domain
 Liberté, égalité, fraternité, the national motto of France
 Life Extension Foundation, a non-profit organization 
Luquillo Experimental Forest, UNESCO Biosphere Reserve in Puerto Rico

Lef
Lef means guts, courage in Dutch. It may also refer to:
Lef, a 1999 Dutch comedy film directed by Ron Termaat